The 1960 Gael Linn Cup, the most important representative competition for elite level participants in the women's team field sport of camogie, was won by Leinster, who defeated Munster in the final, played at Cahir.

Arrangements
Una O'Connor scored 5–1 as Leinster defeated Ulster by 10–5 to 3–1 and Munster defeated Connacht 6–6 to 4–0 in the semi-finals. The final at Cahir was closer than previous years with Leinster hanging on to win by 4–1 to 3–2. Agnes Hourigan wrote in the Irish Press: Leinster snatched victory from a grand Munster side after a thrilling game. Lily Tobin (Kilkenny) played brilliantly in goal for the winners, and got great assistance in defence from Gerry Hughes (Dublin), and Susan Lennon (Louth). Ciss Whitty (Louth) was best of the midfield trio while the forwards all played their part in victory. Terry Moloney (Tipperary) was the outstanding player on a Munster side for whom Bridie Scully (Tipperary), Geraldine Power (Waterford) and Joan Clancy (Cork) all did well. The winners, playing with the breeze in the first half, made the most of their chances though they had rather less of the play than their opponents who missed many opportunities, including four 30s. Trailing by 3–0 to 1–0 at the interval the determined Munster girls gave their best on the change-over and leveled the scoring after ten minutes, Claire Hanrahan Sculy (Tipperary) then exchanged points. Munster win seemed likely when, in strong pressure, Terry Moloney (Tipperary) gave the home side the lead with a point, but Leinster came back for a wonderful goal, finished by Annie Donnelly, and retained their advantage to the end.

Final stages

|}

References

External links
 Camogie Association

1960 in camogie
1960